Lynn K. Wilder (born 1952) is a Christian author and former Brigham Young University (BYU) professor. She became well known for discussing how she left the Church of Jesus Christ of Latter-day Saints (LDS Church) in the 2011 video-documentary Unveiling Grace.

Biography
Wilder attended high school in Richmond, Indiana.  She married her husband Michael in 1974.  The couple have three sons, Joshua, Matt and Micah, and a daughter, Katie. They joined the LDS Church in 1977, after Mormon missionaries knocked on their door and converted them.

Wilder earned a PhD at Ball State University in Muncie, Indiana. She became a professor of Counseling Psychology and Special Education at BYU in 1999.

In 2006, she converted and became an evangelical Born-Again Christian after her son, Micah, who was serving a Mormon mission to Orlando, Florida, told his parents that he was having doubts about the LDS Church and after studying the New Testament. Two years after her conversion, she resigned from BYU.

Jana Riess characterizes Wilder's signature book, Unveiling Grace, as "more even-handed" than the provocative marketing campaign would suggest, differing from what Riess characterizes as the typical tell-all, ex-Mormon memoir in that it shows Wilder's love for Mormons as people, even as she rejects LDS theology.

Bibliography
 Unveiling Grace: The Story of How We Found Our Way Out of the Mormon Church (2013)

Filmography

References

External links
 Interview
 

1952 births
Living people
21st-century American memoirists
21st-century American non-fiction writers
21st-century American women writers
21st-century Christians
American Christian writers
American evangelicals
American women memoirists
American women non-fiction writers
Brigham Young University faculty
Converts to Mormonism
Critics of Mormonism
Former Latter Day Saints
Mormon memoirists
People from Indiana
Writers from Indiana
Writers from Utah